Daron "Fatts" Russell (born May 6, 1998) is an American basketball player for the Galatasaray Nef of the Basketbol Süper Ligi and the Basketball Champions League. He played college basketball for four years for Rhode Island, and after graduating he played one season for the Maryland Terrapins.

Early life and high school career 
Russell grew up in Philadelphia, Pennsylvania, and looked up to basketball player Kobe Bryant, who was born in the same city. His mother gave him the nickname "Fatts," which he has been called his entire life, because he was chubby as a baby. Russell played for Imhotep Institute Charter High School in Philadelphia, where he was coached by Andre Noble. Russell became its all-time leader in points, assists and steals. As a senior, he led his team, which was considered one of the best in the country, to a 31–2 record and the Pennsylvania Interscholastic Athletic Association (PIAA) 4A state championship, scoring 25 points in the title game. Russell was named Philadelphia Public League and Pennsylvania Class 4A most valuable player (MVP). He was a consensus three-star recruit and committed to play collegiately for Rhode Island over offers from Seton Hall, SMU and Western Kentucky, among others.

College career 

On December 4, 2017, Russell was named Atlantic 10 freshman of the week after scoring 20 points in wins over Brown and Providence. As a freshman, Russell averaged 7.0 points per game. In the NCAA Tournament, he scored 15 points including two clinching free throws with 11 seconds remaining and had five assists and two steals in a 83–78 overtime win against Oklahoma. Russell scored a career-high 41 points on March 5, 2019, in a 86–85 overtime win against St. Joseph's. It was the highest scoring effort by a Rhode Island player in a road game. Russell finished his sophomore season averaging 14.2 points and 3.7 assists per game.

On January 15, 2020, Russell scored 25 points against St. Joseph's and surpassed the 1,000 point threshold. He scored 30 points on January 30, in a 87–75 win over VCU. On February 13, Russell was named to the midseason watch list for the Naismith Trophy. At the close of the regular season, Russell was named to the First Team All-Atlantic 10 and the Defensive Team. He was named the U.S. Basketball Writer's Association District I Player of the Year and was selected to the National Association of Basketball Coaches 2019–20 Division I All-District 4 First Team. Russell averaged 18.8 points and 2.9 steals per game, second in Division I. Following the season, he declared for the 2020 NBA draft but intended to keep his college eligibility. On February 16, 2021, in a game against Dayton, Russell became Rhode Island's all-time leader in steals. As a senior, he averaged 14.7 points, 4.5 rebounds and 4.5 assists per game, earning Third Team All-Atlantic 10 honors. After the season, Russell transferred to Maryland.

On February 27, 2022, Russell scored a career-high 27 points and surpassed the 2,000 point mark in a 75-60 win over Ohio State. He was named Honorable Mention All-Big Ten.

Professional career

Mornar (2022–2023) 
On July 7, 2022, Russell signed with Mornar of the ABA League and the Montenegrin League.

Galatasaray Nef (2023–) 
On January 21, 2023, he signed with Galatasaray Nef of the Basketbol Süper Ligi.

Career statistics

College 

|-
| style="text-align:left;"| 2017–18
| style="text-align:left;"| Rhode Island
| 34 || 0 || 17.9 || .352 || .298 || .810 || 1.6 || 1.6 || .8 || .0 || 7.0
|-
| style="text-align:left;"| 2018–19
| style="text-align:left;"| Rhode Island
| 32 || 32 || 34.1 || .338 || .223 || .737 || 2.7 || 3.7 || 1.8 || .3 || 14.2
|-
| style="text-align:left;"| 2019–20
| style="text-align:left;"| Rhode Island
| 30 || 29 || 35.7 || .388 || .357 || .824 || 3.4 || 4.6 || 2.9 || .2 || 18.8
|-
| style="text-align:left;"| 2020–21
| style="text-align:left;"| Rhode Island
| 23 || 22 || 33.2 || .337 || .235 || .799 || 4.5 || 4.5 || 1.9 || .1 || 14.7
|- class="sortbottom"
| style="text-align:center;" colspan="2"| Career
| 119 || 83 || 29.7 || .356 || .281 || .790 || 2.9 || 3.5 || 1.8 || .2 || 13.4

Personal life 
Russell's older brother DeWayne played college basketball for Grand Canyon before playing professionally overseas.

References

External links 
Maryland Terrapins bio
Rhode Island Rams bio

1998 births
Living people
American men's basketball players
Basketball players from Philadelphia
Galatasaray S.K. (men's basketball) players
KK Mornar Bar players
Maryland Terrapins men's basketball players
Point guards
Rhode Island Rams men's basketball players